George Henry Chambers (24 March 1884 – 13 September 1947) was an English cricketer.  He was a right-handed batsman who bowled slow left-arm orthodox.  He was born at Kimberley, Nottinghamshire.

Chambers made his first-class debut for Nottinghamshire against Middlesex in the 1903 County Championship.  The following season he played a single first-class match for the county against the Marylebone Cricket Club at Lord's.  The 1905 season was to be his last in first-class cricket, with him representing Nottinghamshire in 2 further first-class matches against Oxford University and Yorkshire.  In his 4 first-class matches, he scored 58 runs at a batting average of 11.60, with a high score of 30.

References

External links
George Chambers at Cricinfo
George Chambers at CricketArchive

1884 births
1947 deaths
People from Kimberley, Nottinghamshire
Cricketers from Nottinghamshire
English cricketers
Nottinghamshire cricketers
People from the Metropolitan Borough of Doncaster